Kapitan China Seah Tee Heng (? – 1884), also known as Seah Tai Heng, was one of two Chinese members to the Council of State with Tan Hiok Nee. In about 1871, he appointed as third Kapitan China of Johor after Kapitan Tan Kee Soon and Kapitan Tan Cheng Hung.  He held the kangchu concession for Sekudai Ulu and had a gambier and pepper firm in Johor Bahru. The road starting from Istana Besar to Johor Bahru General Hospital formerly known as Jalan Tai Heng, named after him. But after the 1970s, this road has been renamed as Jalan Tun Dr Ismail and Jalan Abu Bakar.

He is the father of Seah Leng Chye.

References
 http://www.jb-tionghua.org.my/%E6%88%90%E7%AB%8B%E7%AE%80%E5%8F%B2/q?cid=12&doit=showclass
 

People from Johor Bahru
1884 deaths
Malaysian people of Chinese descent
Year of birth unknown
Kapitan Cina